The 2012 Tarleton State Texans football represents Tarleton State University in the 2012 NCAA Division II football season as a member of the Lone Star Conference.

Schedule

References

Tarleton State
Tarleton State Texans football seasons
Tarleton State Texans football